Christopher Scott Murphy (born August 3, 1973) is an American lawyer, author, and politician serving as the junior United States senator from Connecticut since 2013. A member of the Democratic Party, he previously served in the United States House of Representatives, representing  from 2007 to 2013. Before being elected to Congress, Murphy was a member of both chambers of the Connecticut General Assembly, serving two terms each in the Connecticut House of Representatives (1999–2003) and the Connecticut Senate (2003–2007).

Murphy ran for the U.S. Senate in 2012 after long-time incumbent Joe Lieberman announced in January 2011 that he would retire from politics rather than seeking a fifth term in office. He defeated former Connecticut secretary of state Susan Bysiewicz in the Democratic primary, and subsequently defeated Republican candidate Linda McMahon for the open seat in the general election. Aged 39 at the time, Murphy was the youngest senator of the 113th Congress.

Early life, education, and early career
Murphy was born on August 3, 1973, in White Plains, New York, to Catherine A. (née Lewczyk) and Scott L. Murphy. He is of Irish and Polish descent. Murphy's father is a corporate litigator who served as the managing partner of Shipman & Goodwin, a Hartford law firm, and his mother is a retired ESL teacher from the Hanmer Elementary School in Wethersfield, Connecticut. Murphy has two younger siblings, a sister, Susannah, and a brother, Ben.

Murphy is a graduate of Wethersfield High School. He received his B.A. degree from his father's alma mater, Williams College, and his J.D. degree from the University of Connecticut School of Law. As an undergraduate exchange student, Murphy also studied at the University of Oxford, where he was a member of Exeter College. On May 19, 2013, Murphy received an honorary Doctor of Humane Letters degree from the University of New Haven.

In 1996, Murphy was campaign manager for Charlotte Koskoff's unsuccessful campaign for the House against Nancy Johnson; a decade later, Murphy himself would unseat Johnson. From 1997 to 1998, Murphy worked for Connecticut State Senate Majority Leader George Jepsen. Murphy was first elected to office in 1997, when he won a seat on the Planning and Zoning Commission in Southington.

Connecticut legislature

House of Representatives

Elections
In 1998, at age 25, Murphy challenged 14-year incumbent Republican State Representative Angelo Fusco. Murphy was endorsed by the six largest labor unions in the state. The CT Employees Independent Union endorsed Murphy, the first time the union endorsed Fusco's opponent. Fusco described himself as a union member, an environmentalist, and a moderate. Murphy defeated Fusco 55%-45%. In 2000, he won re-election to a second term, defeating Barbara Morelli 68%-32%.

Tenure
As early as March 1999, he criticized U.S. Congresswoman Nancy Johnson's vote for impeaching President Bill Clinton. In 2001, he was a co-sponsor of a bill to eliminate child poverty. He proposed legislation that would give free tuition to students of the state's community-technical colleges. He proposed legislation that would ban smoking in state colleges and universities. He co-sponsored a bill that would create an earned income tax credit.

He was a supporter of rights for LGBT people as early as 2002. During his tenure, he served on the Judiciary Committee.

Senate

Elections
After two terms in the Connecticut House, Murphy decided to run for a seat in the Connecticut State Senate at the age of 29. The open 16th district had been held by a Republican for more than a decade. He defeated Republican State Representative Ann Dandrow, 53%-47%. In 2004, he won re-election to a second term, defeating Republican Christopher O'Brien, 60%-37%.

Tenure
In 2003, he joined the Clean Car Alliance and supported California-like environmental standards on auto manufacturers.

In 2004, Murphy supported a bill that would ban smoking in all restaurants and bars.

In 2005, Murphy authored legislation establishing the new Office of Child Protection, to "better coordinate advocacy for abused and neglected children". Murphy also wrote Public Act 05-149, an act permitting stem-cell research while prohibiting human cloning.

The act, signed into law by Governor Jodi Rell, made Connecticut the third state in the nation to permit taxpayer-subsidized stem-cell research.

During his tenure in the State Senate, Murphy was one of the first ten co-sponsors of a civil union bill that passed the General Assembly in 2005. On his Senate campaign website, Murphy summarized his stance, "Let me be clear and simple: LGBT rights are human rights. Marriage equality and nondiscrimination in the military, workplace, classroom and healthcare system, based on real or perceived sexual orientation and gender identity, are civil rights that must be protected under law." During his tenure he served as Chairman of the Public Health Committee.

U.S. House of Representatives

Elections
Murphy chose not to run for re-election to the State Senate, targeting instead the U.S. House seat held by 12-term incumbent Republican Nancy Johnson. In order to challenge Johnson, Murphy moved from Southington to Cheshire. Murphy was elected in 2006 with 56% of the vote, defeating Johnson by a margin of about 22,000 votes; among incumbents, only John Hostettler lost by a larger margin that year.

He carried 35 of the district's 41 cities and towns, including several that had reliably supported Johnson for decades. He defeated Johnson by a significant margin in her hometown of New Britain, which she had represented for over 30 years in both the state senate and in Congress. He was re-elected again in 2008 and 2010, with 60% and 54% of the vote, respectively.

Tenure
Murphy has received high scores from liberal groups such as Americans for Democratic Action, NARAL Pro-Choice America, and various labor unions; and low scores from conservative groups as the Club for Growth, American Conservative Union, and FreedomWorks.

In August 2008, Murphy sent a letter to House Majority Leader Steny Hoyer expressing support for increased oil drilling as part of a bipartisan energy bill.

Murphy supports reform of federal supportive housing programs, which assist low-income people with severe disabilities. In 2008, the House of Representatives passed the "Frank Melville Supportive Housing Investment Act", which Murphy authored to modernize and streamline Section 811, which governs federal supportive housing grants.

Murphy has called for the closure of the Guantanamo Bay detention camp; however, in February 2011, Murphy voted to extend provisions of the Patriot Act.

Health care reform
In 2009, Murphy helped draft HR 3200, the House health-care reform bill. Murphy defended his role in supporting the bill at a contentious town hall meeting in Simsbury in August 2009.

A longtime supporter of health insurance reform, Murphy is a strong proponent of the public option, which entails the creation of an independent, government-sponsored health insurance plan to compete with private companies. Murphy has argued that such a plan would not require government financing and would help to introduce competition into monopolized health insurance markets and help bring down costs.

Congressional and judicial ethics reform
In May 2007, Murphy organized a group of freshmen House members to support the creation of an independent, non-partisan ethics panel to review complaints filed against members of the U.S. House of Representatives. He has been credited with helping to shape the independent Office of Congressional Ethics, which was passed into law by the House in March 2008.

Murphy sponsored a bill that would subject Supreme Court Justices to the same ethical code that applies to other federal judges and suggested in 2011 the possibility of an investigation to decide whether Justice Clarence Thomas had committed ethical violations that would justify removing him from office. The matter in question was Thomas's connection to Harlan Crow  and other supporters of the Republican Party. Murphy circulated a draft letter to other members of Congress asking the House Judiciary Committee leadership to hold a hearing on the Supreme Court Transparency and Disclosure Act, which would end the Supreme Court's immunity to judicial ethics laws.

Contractors operating overseas: 
As a member of the House Oversight and Government Reform Committee, Murphy was highly critical of for-profit government contractors operating in Iraq, which functioned with little government oversight and scrutiny. He introduced and successfully passed into law the "Government Funding Transparency Act of 2008", which required private companies that do the majority of their businesses with the federal government to publicly disclose their top executives' salaries.

Local issues: 
Two home invasions occurred in Murphy's district in 2007 and 2008; the latter in Cheshire being especially brutal, with the rape and murder of a mother and her two young daughters. In response, Murphy proposed making home invasion a federal crime.

Murphy has been a proponent of the proposed New Haven-Hartford-Springfield Commuter Rail Line, an effort to use existing railroad tracks owned by Amtrak to provide daily commuter service on par with Southwestern Connecticut's Metro-North service into New York. In 2008, Murphy successfully added an amendment to rail legislation making it easier for Amtrak and the state of Connecticut to cooperate on the rail project. The line began operation in June 2018.

Murphy proposed reforms of the nation's 'missing-persons' databases, introducing "Billy's Law" in 2009 to improve coordination of law-enforcement efforts to locate missing persons. The legislation was named in honor of Billy Smolinski, Jr., a one-time resident of Murphy's district who disappeared in 2004.

U.S. House committee assignments
Committee on Foreign Affairs
Subcommittee on the Middle East and South Asia
Committee on Oversight and Government Reform
Subcommittee on Health Care, District of Columbia, Census and the National Archives
Subcommittee on Technology, Information Policy, Intergovernmental Relations and Procurement Reform

U.S. Senate

2012 election

Murphy announced on January 20, 2011, that he would run for the Senate seat held by Joe Lieberman, who was retiring in the face of a very low approval rate. It was announced in mid-July that a group spearheaded by a state Capitol lobbyist was forming a Super PAC for his campaign, hoping to raise $1 million to combat a possible opponent.

Murphy defeated former Connecticut Secretary of State Susan Bysiewicz in the Democratic primary and defeated Republican candidate Linda McMahon in the general election. After McMahon's negative ads left Murphy "on the defensive virtually nonstop" and struggling to respond, the Democratic Senatorial Campaign Committee sent additional staff and money to Murphy to help with his campaign, saying they are "100 percent behind [him]."  Among the issues raised was Chase Home Finance sued for foreclosure against Murphy, whose campaign initially responded by claiming that Murphy had missed "a couple of mortgage payments." Murphy claimed that he did not know he was in default until legal proceedings started. Murphy received a loan at the rate of 4.99% from Webster Bank in 2008 to consolidate his previous mortgages. At the time of this loan, Murphy was serving on the House Financial Services Committee. Murphy's opponent McMahon accused him of receiving what she called "special interest loans," and called on Murphy to release his financial records. Bank officials and outside experts claim there was nothing improper about the loans made to Murphy.

On November 6, Murphy defeated McMahon with 55% of the vote, winning every county except Litchfield County. At the time, it was the most expensive political race in Connecticut history, and one of the most expensive Senate races in 2012.

Tenure
Murphy took office as the junior United States senator for Connecticut on January 3, 2013. In the Senate, Murphy has worked on issues funding for transportation and infrastructure, the preservation of Long Island Sound, growing small farms and promoting Connecticut manufacturing.

In 2016, Murphy walked 126 miles across the state of Connecticut, listening to constituents and holding daily town hall meetings. Murphy repeated the walk in 2017, covering 106 miles and holding five town hall meetings.

In early 2020, Murphy met with Iranian foreign minister Javad Zarif on the sidelines of Munich Security Conference. They discussed U.S. nationals being detained in Iran, Iran's involvement in the Yemeni Civil War, and Iranian-backed militias in Iraq. In a post on Medium.com, Murphy wrote: "I have no delusions about Iran — they are our adversary, responsible for the killing of thousands of Americans and unacceptable levels of support for terrorist organizations throughout the Middle East. But I think it’s dangerous to not talk to your enemies. Discussions and negotiations are a way to ease tensions and reduce the chances for crisis."

In the wake of the 2021 storming of the United States Capitol, Murphy called for the removal of Donald Trump from office. Murphy also stated that he will lead an investigation into the security breaches and law enforcement response during the attack.

Commenting on the day of the fall of Kabul, Murphy said, "Our priority now needs to be evacuating American personnel and as many of our Afghan partners as humanly possible. I firmly believe that President Biden made the right decision by standing by the Trump administration's decision to bring our troops home and end the longest war in our nation's history."

Committee assignments

Current
United States Senate Committee on Appropriations (2015-)
Subcommittee on Homeland Security (Chair)
Subcommittee on Labor, Health and Human Services, Education, and Related Agencies
Subcommittee on Legislative Branch 
Subcommittee on State, Foreign Operations, and Related Programs
Subcommittee on Transportation, Housing and Urban Development, and Related Agencies
Committee on Foreign Relations
Subcommittee on Africa and Global Health Policy
Subcommittee on East Asia, The Pacific, and International Cybersecurity Policy
Subcommittee on Europe and Regional Security Cooperation (Chair, 2013-2015)
Subcommittee on Near East, South Asia, Central Asia, and Counterterrorism (Chair, 2021-)
Committee on Health, Education, Labor, and Pensions
Subcommittee on Primary Health and Aging

Previous
United States Congressional Joint Economic Committee (2013-2015)

Caucus memberships
Expand Social Security Caucus

Political positions

Health care
Murphy has been a leading supporter of the Affordable Care Act in the Senate and has opposed Republican attempts to repeal the law, consistently speaking on the floor about the positive impact it has had on his constituents.

In April 2017, Murphy was one of five Democratic senators to sign a letter to Former President Trump that warned failure "to take immediate action to oppose the lawsuit or direct House Republicans to forgo this effort will increase instability in the insurance market, as insurers may choose not to participate in the marketplace in 2018" and that they remained concerned that his administration "has still not provided certainty to insurers and consumers that you will protect the cost-sharing subsidies provided under the law."

Murphy called the American Health Care Act of 2017 "an intellectual and moral dumpster fire," that will cause 24 million Americans to lose their health care coverage.

After the overturning of Roe v. Wade in June 2022, Murphy called it a "disaster" of a decision.

Economic issues
Murphy has introduced two pieces of legislation, the American Jobs Matter Act and the 21st Century Buy American Act to close loopholes in the existing Buy American laws and encourage the U.S. government to purchase American-made goods.

In May 2018, Murphy was one of twelve senators to sign a letter to Chairman of the Federal Labor Relations Authority Colleen Kiko urging the FLRA to end efforts to close its Boston regional office until Congress debated the matter, furthering that the FLRA closing down its seven regional offices would cause staff to be placed farther away from the federal employees they protect the rights of.

Murphy has spoken out against outsourcing. However, Murphy voted against Bernie Sanders' proposed motion to United States Innovation and Competition Act concerning semiconductor manufacturers. The motion was to help possible unionizing efforts amongst employees of the manufacturers the act would supply federal funding to, as well as preventing those companies from outsourcing jobs overseas.

Mental health
On August 5, 2015, Murphy introduced the bipartisan Mental Health Reform Act of 2015 with Republican Senator Bill Cassidy from Louisiana. The legislation, aimed at overhauling the mental health system, would build treatment capacity, promote integrated care models, expand the mental health workforce and encourage the enforcement of existing mental health parity laws.

The bill was informed by listening sessions that Senator Murphy conducted across the state of Connecticut. The bill was widely supported by the mental health community, with organizations including the American Psychiatric Association, Mental Health America and the National Council for Behavioral Health applauding its introduction.

On March 16, 2016, the Mental Health Reform Act was passed unanimously by the Senate Health, Education, Labor, and Pensions (HELP) Committee. On December 7, 2016, the Senate passed Mental Health Reform as a part of the 21st Century Cures Act. The bill also provided $1 billion in funding to address the opioid crisis and funding for NIH Cancer Moonshot initiative. The bill was signed into law by President Obama on December 13, 2016.

Gun policy

Murphy has an F rating with the National Rifle Association and a 100% rating with the Brady Campaign to Prevent Gun Violence.

The Sandy Hook Elementary School shooting occurred in Newtown, Connecticut, within Murphy's House district near the end of his term. In the aftermath of the shooting, he became a leading voice in the movement to prevent gun violence, supporting numerous policies including universal background checks and ending the ban on gun violence research at the CDC. Murphy supported the bipartisan Manchin-Toomey background checks proposal, which would have strengthened and expanded the existing background check system and established a National Commission on Mass Violence to study in-depth all the causes of mass violence.

When the proposal failed to meet the 60 vote threshold for advancement, Murphy stated, "This is a day when the Republican filibuster stood in the way of 90% of Americans."

In his first month in office, he criticized the National Rifle Association and Apple Inc. for a video game involving shooting with guns that was labeled appropriate for children as young as four.

On June 24, 2015, Murphy said, "Since Sandy Hook there has been a school shooting, on average, every week"; The Washington Post described this statement as misleading. On June 15–16, 2016, Murphy staged a filibuster regarding gun control following the Orlando nightclub shooting, the deadliest mass shooting in U.S. history at the time. The filibuster entered the list of the top 10 longest filibusters in U.S. history.

In the wake of the Orlando shooting, Murphy said "This phenomenon of near-constant mass shootings happens only in America – nowhere else" and "this epidemic will continue without end if Congress continues to sit on its hands and do nothing – again."

After the 2017 Las Vegas shooting, Murphy reinforced his criticism of gun laws.

Following the 2017 Sutherland Springs church shooting, Murphy and fellow U.S. Senator John Cornyn (R-TX) introduced the bipartisan Fix NICS Act to ensure criminal records are submitted to the federal background check system.

Following the 2018 Stoneman Douglas High School shooting, Murphy made an impassioned call for action in the Senate stating that "this happens nowhere else other than the United States of America, this epidemic of mass slaughter, this scourge of school shooting after school shooting. It only happens here not because of coincidence, not because of bad luck, but as a consequence of our inaction. We are responsible for a level of mass atrocity that happens in this country with zero parallel anywhere else. As a parent it scares me to death that this body doesn't take seriously the safety of my children, and it seems like a lot of parents in South Florida will be asking the same question today. We pray for families, for the victims. We hope for the best."

In March 2018, Murphy was one of ten senators to sign a letter to Chairman of the United States Senate Committee on Health, Education, Labor and Pensions Lamar Alexander and ranking Democrat Patty Murray requesting they schedule a hearing on the causes and remedies of mass shootings in the wake of the Stoneman Douglas High School shooting.

In September 2020, Murphy published a book on gun control, The Violence Inside Us: A Brief History of an Ongoing American Tragedy.

Foreign policy

Murphy is one of the first members of Congress to come out in opposition to US support for the Saudi-led military campaign in Yemen, which was launched in 2015. In a speech on January 29, 2016, he recommended that the US stop supporting this military campaign and suspend military sales to Saudi Arabia until the US receives assurances that the war will not distract from Saudi efforts against al-Qaeda and ISIS and Saudi Arabia lessens its worldwide support of Wahhabism. Murphy is a member of the Senate Foreign Relations Committee and the ranking Democratic member of the subcommittee on the Middle East and Counter-terrorism. In the edition of June 8, 2015 of Foreign Affairs, Murphy co-authored "Principles for a Progressive Foreign Policy," proposing a framework for a Democratic foreign policy strategy.

In November 2017, Murphy accused the United States of complicity in the war crimes committed in Yemen by the Saudi-led military coalition and in Yemen's humanitarian crisis, saying: "Thousands and thousands inside Yemen today are dying....This horror is caused in part by our decision to facilitate a bombing campaign that is murdering children and to endorse a Saudi strategy inside Yemen that is deliberately using disease and starvation and the withdrawal of humanitarian support as a tactic." In October 2018, Murphy wrote that if the reports of Jamal Khashoggi's murder are true, "it should represent a fundamental break" in Saudi Arabia–United States relations. Murphy, along with Bernie Sanders and Mike Lee, advanced a vote to co-sponsor a resolution that would require the President to "withdraw troops in or "affecting" Yemen within 30 days unless they are fighting al Qaeda." In February 2019, Murphy was one of seven senators to reintroduce legislation requiring sanctions on Saudi officials involved in the killing of Jamal Khashoggi and seeking to address support for the Yemen civil war through prohibiting some weapons sales to Saudi Arabia and U.S. military refueling of Saudi coalition planes.

Murphy is renowned as one of the most vociferous critics of Russia in the Senate. Among his positions on US-Russian relations, Murphy holds that Russia will remain a permanent, persistent threat to the United States and its security interests, regardless of the incumbent regime in the country. At an event at the Atlantic Council in 2019, Murphy professed the need for NATO allies to understand that the country has been always “far behind Russia in understanding our vulnerabilities." At the same event, Murphy echoed the sentiments of Lithuanian and Georgian foreign ministers that Russia's imperialist nature will always put it at odds with the United States, and that little will change until Russia as a "captive state of aggregate territories" changes its nature.

In March 2016, Murphy authored the bipartisan bill the Countering Foreign Propaganda and Disinformation Act, along with Republican Senator Rob Portman. Congressman Adam Kinzinger introduced the U.S. House version of the bill. After the 2016 U.S. presidential election, worries grew that Russian propaganda spread and organized by the Russian government swayed the outcome of the election, and representatives in the U.S. Congress took action to safeguard the National security of the United States by advancing legislation to monitor incoming propaganda from external threats. On November 30, 2016, legislators approved a measure within the National Defense Authorization Act to ask the U.S. State Department to take action against foreign propaganda through an interagency panel. The legislation authorized funding of $160 million over a two-year-period. The initiative was developed through the Countering Foreign Propaganda and Disinformation Act.

In September 2016, in advance of a UN Security Council resolution 2334 condemning Israeli settlements in the occupied Palestinian territories, Murphy signed an AIPAC-sponsored letter urging President Obama to veto "one-sided" resolutions against Israel.

In July 2017, Murphy voted in favor of the Countering America's Adversaries Through Sanctions Act that placed sanctions on Iran together with Russia and North Korea.

In December 2017, Murphy criticized Donald Trump's decision to recognize Jerusalem as the capital of Israel, saying that it "It needs to be done at the right time and in the right manner."

In December 2018, President Donald Trump ordered the withdrawal of U.S. troops from Syria. Murphy said in a statement: "I support withdrawing troops, but we must also rejoin a diplomatic process that the Trump administration has left to other powers, and we need a surge in humanitarian relief. That's the only way we can protect the Syrian people against a Turkish incursion or regime reprisals.

In April 2019, Murphy was one of thirty-four senators to sign a letter to President Trump encouraging him "to listen to members of your own Administration and reverse a decision that will damage our national security and aggravate conditions inside Central America", asserting that Trump had "consistently expressed a flawed understanding of U.S. foreign assistance" since becoming president and that he was "personally undermining efforts to promote U.S. national security and economic prosperity" through preventing the use of Fiscal Year 2018 national security funding. The senators argued that foreign assistance to Central American countries created less migration to the U.S., citing the funding's helping to improve conditions in those countries.

In January 2020, Murphy wrote to FBI Director Christopher A. Wray, urging the FBI to "investigate the allegations" that Saudi Arabia "illegally compromised and stole personal data" from Jeff Bezos, the owner of The Washington Post, as part of a possible effort to "influence, if not silence, the Washington Post’s reporting on Saudi Arabia".

In May 2020, Murphy voiced his opposition to Israel's plan to annex parts of the Israeli-occupied West Bank.

Marijuana

Murphy has a "B" rating from NORML for his voting history regarding cannabis-related causes. In 2016, he voted in favor of the Daines/Merkley Amendment to enable Veterans Administration doctors to discuss the benefits of medical marijuana with their patients. He also voted in favor of Mikulski Medical Marijuana Amendment, which protects users in states with medical marijuana laws from federal interference.

Immigration 
In July 2019, Murphy and fifteen other Senate Democrats introduced the Protecting Sensitive Locations Act which mandated that ICE agents get approval from a supervisor ahead of engaging in enforcement actions at sensitive locations with the exception of special circumstances and that agents receive annual training in addition to being required to report annually regarding enforcement actions in those locations.

U.S. Supreme Court

After the U.S. Supreme Court overturned Roe v. Wade in June 2022, Murphy called the justices that supported the decision "politicians" and that "The Constitution to them is just a fun tool to help them impose their political views on the entire country. The implausible inconsistency of the guns and abortion rulings is both sickening and revealing."

Personal life
Murphy and his wife Catherine (née Holahan) married in August 2007. They have two sons. Raised as a Congregationalist, Murphy identifies as "Protestant/unaffiliated" but said in 2015 that he was "not a regular churchgoer these days, in part, because of kids. In part because of a busy schedule."

Electoral history

References

External links

U.S. Senator Chris Murphy official U.S. Senate website
Chris Murphy for Senate

|-

|-

|-

|-

|-

|-

|-

1973 births
21st-century American politicians
Alumni of Exeter College, Oxford
American gun control activists
American people of Irish descent
American politicians of Polish descent
Democratic Party Connecticut state senators
Democratic Party members of the United States House of Representatives from Connecticut
Democratic Party United States senators from Connecticut
Living people
Democratic Party members of the Connecticut House of Representatives
People from Southington, Connecticut
People from White Plains, New York
Politicians from New Haven, Connecticut
University of Connecticut School of Law alumni
Williams College alumni
21st-century American non-fiction writers
Connecticut lawyers